Isoceras bipunctata is a species of moth of the family Cossidae. It is found in Georgia, Azerbaijan, Turkey, Iran, Lebanon, Jordan, Syria, Israel and Iraq.

Adults have been recorded on wing from March to June in Israel.

References

Moths described in 1887
Cossinae